Oliver James Norwood (born 12 April 1991) is a professional footballer who plays as a midfielder for Championship club Sheffield United.

Norwood began his career with Manchester United, and had loan spells at Carlisle United, Scunthorpe United and Coventry City before moving permanently to Huddersfield Town and then Reading. He then achieved three consecutive promotions to the Premier League with three clubs: Brighton, Fulham and Sheffield United between 2017–2019. Although he was born in England, and represented that country at under-17 level, he has represented Northern Ireland at every level from under-19 to the senior team.

Club career

Manchester United

Early career
Born in Burnley, Lancashire, Norwood began his football career playing for his brother's team in his home town. He was spotted by Manchester United scouts when he was 6 years old and joined the club at the age of 7. After eight appearances for Manchester United's under-18s side in 2005–06 and 2006–07, he joined the club as a trainee in July 2007. He became a regular in the under-18s team in 2007–08, scoring twice in 22 appearances, and he made his debut for the reserve team in a 2–1 away win over Middlesbrough on 6 November 2007. The following season, he scored nine goals in 28 appearances for the under-18s, as well as appearing a further 10 times for the reserves. His form prompted the club to sign him on a professional contract in July 2009.

2009–10 season
2009–10 was a big season for Norwood, as he made the full step up to the reserve team and also received his first call-up to the first-team for their Champions League group stage match away to Wolfsburg. However, although he made the trip to Germany, Norwood was not named in the 18-man match-day squad.

Carlisle United (loan)
On 16 September 2010, Norwood signed for Carlisle United on a one-month emergency loan contract, following a knee injury to Carlisle captain Paul Thirlwell. He made his debut for the Cumbrian side on 18 September 2010 in a 0–0 draw at home to Brighton & Hove Albion, playing the full 90 minutes of the game. Norwood made a total of seven appearances during his loan spell, with six coming in the league, before his stay was cut short by injury in October 2010.

Scunthorpe United (loan)
On 24 August 2011, Norwood signed for Scunthorpe United on a six-month loan. He made his debut for Scunthorpe in the side's 2–1 League Cup second round defeat at home to Newcastle United on 25 August 2011, when he played the full 90 minutes plus extra time. His league debut came just two days later with another start in a 3–2 defeat away at Sheffield Wednesday on 27 August 2011. His first league goal of the season came in Scunthorpe's draw at home to Huddersfield Town on 25 October 2011, scoring the opener on 10 minutes; the game ended 2–2. Norwood received the first red card of his career in Scunthorpe's 3–2 away defeat to Notts County on 26 November 2011, when he was sent off for a foul on Jeff Hughes. Norwood played a total of 16 starts and scored once during his loan spell before returning to parent club Manchester United in January 2012.

Coventry City (loan)
Norwood completed a loan switch to Championship side Coventry City on the January 2012 deadline day, and remained on loan until the end of the season. Norwood made his Coventry City debut in the team's 3–2 home defeat to Ipswich Town on 4 February 2012, coming on as a 25th-minute substitute for David Bell; his first start for the club came in their next game: a 2–0 defeat on 11 February 2012 away to Reading. On 21 March 2012, he scored a stoppage-time equaliser against Cardiff to earn a point for the Sky Blues. He scored his second Coventry City goal in the 2–0 home win against Portsmouth on 24 March 2012.

Huddersfield Town
At the end of the 2011–12 season, Norwood confirmed that he was rejecting Manchester United's offer of a contract extension to pursue first-team football. In June 2012, Manchester United agreed compensation packages for Norwood with Championship clubs Barnsley and Huddersfield Town. Norwood rejected Barnsley's offer on 29 June, and he signed a three-year contract with Huddersfield later that day. He made his league debut in a 1–0 away defeat to Cardiff City on 17 August. Norwood scored his first goal for the Terriers with the opener in a 3–1 win over Sheffield Wednesday at Hillsborough Stadium on 19 September.

Reading
On 19 August 2014, Norwood was spotted in the crowd at the Madejski Stadium watching his current club, Huddersfield Town, playing the club he would soon join. He had his medical the following day, and then agreed personal terms the day after that. The fee was described by Huddersfield as a "significant and undisclosed fee". He took the number 6 shirt. Norwood made his Reading debut as a second-half substitute in the 4–0 defeat by Nottingham Forest on 23 August 2014.

Brighton & Hove Albion
On 3 August 2016, Norwood signed a three-year contract with Brighton & Hove Albion. On 16 August 2016, Norwood made his debut in the 3–0 win over Rotherham United.

During the 2016/17 season, he played 33 times as Brighton & Hove Albion earned promotion to the Premier League after finishing as Runners Up to Newcastle United in The Championship.

Fulham (loan)
During July 2017, Norwood joined EFL Championship side Fulham on a season-long loan deal following Brighton gaining promotion to the Premier League. He scored his first goal for Fulham in a 2–1 loss at Burton Albion on 16 September 2017.

During his loan spell, Norwood scored 5 goals and played 41 times for Fulham in all competitions including playing in the playoff final, as Fulham earned promotion to Premier League after winning the 2018 Championship play-off Final against Aston Villa at Wembley Stadium on 26 May 2018.

Sheffield United (loan)
On 13 August 2018, Norwood joined Sheffield United in an initial loan deal, with the transfer due to be made permanent in January 2019. He made his debut for the club the following day against Hull City in a league cup tie. The Blades lost 4–5 on penalties following a 1–1 draw with Norwood being the only player to miss in the penalty shoot-out. He scored his first goal for the club in a 4–1 win over Aston Villa on 1 September 2018, netting a free-kick.

Sheffield United
On 4 January 2019, Norwood made his deal at Sheffield United permanent. In March 2019 he was selected to the 2018–19 Championship Team of the Season. On 28 April 2019, Norwood saw United promoted to the Premier League. On 10 June 2020 Norwood signed a new three year contract.

International career

England youth
Although he was born in England, Norwood's heritage is Northern Irish; it is this heritage that has allowed him to represent both England and Northern Ireland in international football. He was first called up to the England under-17 team in September 2007 ahead of their 2008 UEFA Under-17 Championship qualifying matches against Malta, Estonia and Portugal in Estonia from 21 to 26 October 2007. He appeared in all three fixtures, his debut coming in the 6–0 win over Malta on 21 October, in which he came on as a 61st-minute substitute for Harry Forrester. However, the match against Portugal would prove to be his final appearance for an England team.

Northern Ireland youth & B teams
Norwood made his first appearance for a Northern Ireland team at "B" international level, in a 3–0 defeat away to Scotland B on 6 May 2009; he came on as a substitute for Niall McGinn in the 67th minute, and forced a fingertip save from Scotland goalkeeper David Marshall with a 30-yard free-kick three minutes later. His under-21 debut followed three months later, when he came on as a substitute for Corry Evans in a 2–1 away defeat to Portugal on 12 August 2009. Norwood received national media attention in November 2009 after he scored free-kicks against both Germany and the Czech Republic's under-21 teams.

Norwood's reverse progression through the Northern Irish national teams was completed in May 2010, when he appeared for the under-19 side in the 2010 UEFA Under-19 Championship elite qualifying round. In his first match for the under-19s, against Russia, he scored two goals in the last 10 minutes to salvage a draw after Northern Ireland went 2–0 down shortly into the second half. He then followed this up with a penalty to open the scoring against Italy two days later, only for Italy to win the match 3–2.

Northern Ireland senior team
Norwood made his debut for the Northern Ireland senior side on 11 August 2010, in a 2–0 friendly defeat away to Montenegro. He came on as a second-half substitute for Sammy Clingan, and in the final few minutes attempted to chip the Montenegrin goalkeeper Mladen Božović, only to send the ball over the bar. He started for the first time in the senior team when Northern Ireland lost 3–0 to Italy on their last game in UEFA Euro 2012 qualifiers.

He retired from international football on 19 August 2019, aged 28.

Style of play
Norwood is a central midfielder, known for his passing and ability to dictate tempo. He is renowned as a free-kick and set piece specialist and for scoring goals from long range.

Career statistics

Club

International

Honours
Brighton & Hove Albion
EFL Championship runner-up: 2016–17

Fulham
EFL Championship play-offs: 2018

Sheffield United
EFL Championship runner-up: 2018–19

Individual
PFA Team of the Year: 2018–19 Championship

References

External links

Profile at Northern Ireland's Footballing Greats
Northern Ireland stats at Irish FA
England stats at theFA

1991 births
Living people
Footballers from Burnley
English footballers
England youth international footballers
Association footballers from Northern Ireland
Northern Ireland youth international footballers
Northern Ireland under-21 international footballers
Northern Ireland B international footballers
Northern Ireland international footballers
Association football midfielders
Manchester United F.C. players
Carlisle United F.C. players
Scunthorpe United F.C. players
Coventry City F.C. players
Huddersfield Town A.F.C. players
Reading F.C. players
Brighton & Hove Albion F.C. players
Fulham F.C. players
Sheffield United F.C. players
English Football League players
Premier League players
UEFA Euro 2016 players
English people of Northern Ireland descent